Compartment No. 6 is a 2021 internationally co-produced drama road movie co-written and directed by Juho Kuosmanen, starring Seidi Haarla and Yuri Borisov, based on the 2011 novel of the same name by Rosa Liksom.

The film was selected to compete for the Palme d'Or at the 2021 Cannes Film Festival. It shares the Grand Prix with Asghar Farhadi's A Hero. It was selected as the Finnish submission for the Best International Feature Film at the 94th Academy Awards and was one of the 15 "shortlisted" films in the category but was not nominated for the Oscar.

During the Cannes Film Festival, Sony Pictures Classics bought the distribution rights to the film for North America as well as Latin America, Eastern Europe (excluding co-production country Russia, where the film was distributed by the domestic branch of sister company Sony Pictures Releasing in the country), Southeast Asia and the Middle East, marking the company's second acquisition of a Finnish film following Aki Kaurismäki's The Man Without a Past in 2002.

Plot
Traveling by train from Moscow to Murmansk to study the Kanozero Petroglyphs, a Finnish student finds herself in a compartment with a gruff Russian miner.

Cast
 Seidi Haarla as Laura
 Yuri Borisov as Lyokha
 Dinara Drukarova as Irina  
 Julia Aug as Natalia

Reception

Critical response

Accolades

See also
 List of submissions to the 94th Academy Awards for Best International Feature Film
 List of Finnish submissions for the Academy Award for Best International Feature Film

References

External links
 

2020s drama road movies
2021 films
2021 drama films
Estonian drama films
Films based on Finnish novels
Films directed by Juho Kuosmanen
Films set on trains
Films shot in Saint Petersburg
Finnish drama films
Finnish LGBT-related films
2020s Finnish-language films
Finnish multilingual films
German drama road movies
Russian drama road movies
Russian LGBT-related films
2020s Russian-language films
Russian multilingual films
Sony Pictures Classics films
Cannes Grand Prix winners
2021 multilingual films
Estonian multilingual films
Russian-language Finnish films